Claremont High School is a public high school nestled in the northern foothills of the Pomona Valley in Claremont, California, United States. Part of the Claremont Unified School District, it is a California Distinguished School, a two-time national Blue Ribbon School of Excellence (1986–1987, 1999–2000), and a nationally recognized International Baccalaureate (IB) World School.

The school serves Claremont and a small section of Pomona.

Athletics
Claremont's sports programs include football, basketball, volleyball, golf, baseball, softball, water polo, swimming and diving, wrestling, tennis, soccer, track and field, and cross-country.  The varsity football team has won 21 league championships, including 5 CIF titles.  The cross-country team earned a fourth-place finish at the 2009 CIF State Meet and a third-place finish at the 2010 CIF State Meet, in recent years they have been dominant, with a 3rd place finish in 2011, 4th place finish in 2014, 4th place in 2015, STATE CHAMPS in 2016, 4th place in  2017, 3rd place in 2018, and 3rd again in 2019 (All at the D2 State meets). The girls cross-country team won first-place in the 2016, 2017, and 2018 CIF State Meets, and made Nationals both in 2017 and 2018. The boys also finished first in the 2016 CIF State Meet. In 2009 and 2010, the varsity tennis team won CIF  titles. The soccer team won back to back league titles in 1993, 2001–2002 and 2011.

Claremont is part of the Palomares League. Claremont High School has 24 varsity athletic teams.

Notable alumni
 Jessica Alba, actress and model
 Ady Barkan, political activist and author
 Tony Beltran, MLS defender for the Real Salt Lake
 Jacob Bertrand, actor
 Kori Carter, NCAA and 2017 world champion in 400 meter hurdles
 Craig Colclough, operatic bass-baritone
 John Darnielle, musician and singer-songwriter
 Malu Dreyer, German politician, Minister-President of the state of Rhineland-Palatinate, spent 1977 as an exchange student at Claremont
 Aundrea Fimbres, singer and dancer
 Justin Germano, baseball player in the U.S, Japan and Korea 
 Rod Gilfry, leading American operatic baritone
 Elliot Graham, film editor
 Ben Harper, musician and singer-songwriter
 Martin Hewitt, actor
 Alex Hinshaw, MLB baseball player for the San Francisco Giants
 Anastasia Horne, actress/singer
 Hughes brothers, film directors, producers and screenwriters
 Todd Hughes, film director, producer and screenwriter
 Matt Jones, actor
 Dan McGwire, former NFL quarterback for the Seattle Seahawks
 Cameron Morrah, NFL tight end for the Seattle Seahawks
 Cameron Munter, U.S. Ambassador to Pakistan
 Locke Olson, gold medal-winning USA Basketball player at the 1955 Pan American Games
 Sam Quinones, journalist and former reporter for Los Angeles Times (2004-2014)
 Dileep Rao, actor
 Dave Rice, college basketball coach, UNLV
Noah Song, professional baseball player
 Dillon Tate, baseball player
 Peter Thum, co-founder of Ethos Water
 Rozz Williams, founder of American gothic rock band Christian Death and pioneer of the American gothic rock scene

References

External links

 Official website

Claremont, California
High schools in Los Angeles County, California
Public high schools in California
Educational institutions established in 1964
International Baccalaureate schools in California
1964 establishments in California